The Luck of a Sailor is a 1934 British romance film directed by Robert Milton and starring Greta Nissen, David Manners and Clifford Mollison. It was made at Elstree Studios.

Cast
 Greta Nissen as Queen Helena  
 David Manners as Captain Colin  
 Clifford Mollison as Shorty  
 Camilla Horn as Louise  
 Hugh Wakefield as King Karl  
 Lawrence Grossmith as Silvius  
 Reginald Purdell as Jenkins 
 H. F. Maltby as Admiral  
 Jimmy Godden as Betz  
 Jean Cadell as Princess Rosanna  
 Cecil Ramage as Owner  
 Gus McNaughton as Official  
 Arnold Lucy 
 J.H. Roberts

References

Bibliography
 Low, Rachael. Filmmaking in 1930s Britain. George Allen & Unwin, 1985.
 Wood, Linda. British Films, 1927-1939. British Film Institute, 1986.

External links

1934 films
British romance films
1930s romance films
Films directed by Robert Milton
Films shot at British International Pictures Studios
Seafaring films
British black-and-white films
1930s English-language films
1930s British films